Trekeivesteps is a hamlet in the parish of St Cleer in Cornwall, England, United Kingdom. It is in the valley of the River Fowey between North Trekeive and South Trekeive.

References

Hamlets in Cornwall